Rosta is a rural locality (a selo) in Mazadinsky Selsoviet, Tlyaratinsky District, Republic of Dagestan, Russia. The population was 77 as of 2010.

Geography 
Rosta is located 29 km north of Tlyarata (the district's administrative centre) by road. Niklida and Mazada are the nearest rural localities.

References 

Rural localities in Tlyaratinsky District